Robert C. Elston (born ) is a British born statistical geneticist and distinguished professor emeritus at Case Western Reserve University. He is one of the eponyms of the Elston–Stewart algorithm and Haseman–Elston regression.

Life
Elston was born in London, England in 1932.

In the 1970s he worked with John Stewart to create the Elston–Stewart algorithm which enables researchers to estimate the likelihood of genotype data given a pedigree.

In 1980s Elston was working at the Louisiana State University Medical School in New Orleans working on statistical genetics. Elston left LSU for Case Western Reserve University in Cleveland in 1995 taking other staff with him.

References

Bibliography

External links

Living people
Case Western Reserve University faculty
Genetic epidemiologists
Fellows of the American Statistical Association
Biostatisticians
Cornell University alumni
Alumni of the University of Cambridge
1932 births
British epidemiologists
English geneticists
Statistical geneticists
English statisticians
English emigrants to the United States